National Development Party is a political party in Brunei. Although legally registered as a political party, it has not been able to gain electoral representation as legislative elections have not been held in Brunei since 1962. The party formally legalised on 31 August 2005 by former rebel and Secretary General of the banned Brunei People's Party, Yassin Affandi, aka Haji Muhammad Yasin bin Abdul Rahman, co-founded the Party, which is the third political party founded legally in Brunei to date.

NDP is member of the International Monarchist Conference.

References

External links
 Official Facebook
 Official blog
 Official site
  Former official site
  Former official site

Political parties in Brunei
Political parties established in 2005
2005 establishments in Brunei
Monarchist parties